Leon Jessen (born 11 June 1986) is a retired Danish football defender.

Career
Jessen began his career 2001 with Brande IF and joined Ikast FS in 2003. On 23 June 2010, Jessen left the Danish Superliga side FC Midtjylland after five years and signed with 1. FC Kaiserslautern in Germany (Bundesliga).

On 10 July 2015 it was confirmed, that Jessen had signed a three-year contract with Danish Superliga-side Esbjerg fB.

It was announced on 31 December 2016, that Jessen would retire.

References

External links
 

1986 births
Living people
Danish men's footballers
Denmark international footballers
Denmark under-21 international footballers
Ikast FS players
FC Midtjylland players
1. FC Kaiserslautern players
Expatriate footballers in Germany
Danish Superliga players
Bundesliga players
2. Bundesliga players
Danish expatriate sportspeople in Germany
Danish expatriate men's footballers
Association football defenders
People from Ikast-Brande Municipality
Sportspeople from the Central Denmark Region